The 1977 World Karate Championships are the 4th edition of the World Karate Championships, and were held in Nippon Budokan, Tokyo, Japan in 1977.

Medalists

Medal table

References

 Results
 Results

External links
 World Karate Federation

World Championships
World Karate Championships
World Karate Championships
Karate Championships
1977 in Tokyo
Karate competitions in Japan
April 1977 sports events in Asia